The 2017–18 George Washington Colonials men's basketball team represented George Washington University during the 2017–18 NCAA Division I men's basketball season. The Colonials were led by second-year head coach Maurice Joseph. They played their home games at the Charles E. Smith Center in Washington, D.C. as members of the Atlantic 10 Conference. They finished the season 15–18, 7–11 in A-10 play to finish in a three-way tie for 10th place. They defeated Fordham in the first round of the A-10 tournament before losing to Saint Louis in the second round.

Previous season
The Colonials finished the 2016–17 season with a record of 20–15, 10–8 in A-10 play to finish in sixth place. They defeated Saint Louis in the second round of the A-10 tournament before losing in the quarterfinals to Richmond. They were invited to the College Basketball Invitational where they defeated Toledo in the first round before losing in the quarterfinals to UIC.

Head coach Mike Lonergan was fired on September 17, 2016, after the school concluded a two-month investigation into alleged emotional abuse against his players. Maurice Joseph was named interim head coach on September 27.

On March 27, 2017, the school removed the interim tag and named Joseph full-time head coach.

Offseason

Departures

Incoming transfers

2017 recruiting class

2018 recruiting class

Preseason 
In a poll of the league's head coaches and select media members at the conference's media day, the Colonials were picked to finish in 11th place in the A-10. Yuta Watanabe was named to the conference's preseason second team.

Roster

Schedule and results

|-
!colspan=9 style=|Exhibition

|-
!colspan=12 style=| Non-conference regular season

|-
!colspan=12 style=| Atlantic 10 regular season

|-
!colspan=9 style=|Atlantic 10 tournament

See also
 2017–18 George Washington Colonials women's basketball team

References

George Washington Colonials men's basketball seasons
George Washington